Carshalton High School for Girls is an academy school for 11- to 18-year-old girls in Carshalton, Sutton, England. The headteacher is Maurice Devenney

It is a popular school, and has achieved many awards for efforts from both students and staff. There are many resources for students at the school, including a drama and dance studio and a brand new Sixth Form common room. In January 2011, the school was inspected by Ofsted. They were named as a 'Good School with Outstanding Features'. They were also granted Academy Status in June 2011, along with other schools in Sutton, including Carshalton Boys Sports College.

Carshalton High School for Girls is commonly known as CHSG and has recently celebrated 50 years of being a girls school. It used to be a mixed school.

There is a small display in the entrance to the library which shows some of the equipment the school used to have such as an attendance book.

The school has specialisms in the arts and humanities.

See also 
 Carshalton Boys Sports College
 List of schools in Sutton

References

External links 
 Official website
 iSurrey information

Girls' schools in London
Academies in the London Borough of Sutton
Secondary schools in the London Borough of Sutton
Carshalton
Specialist arts colleges in England
Specialist humanities colleges in England